Northeast 60th Avenue is a light rail station on the MAX Blue, Green and Red Lines in Portland, Oregon. It is the 12th stop eastbound on the eastside MAX line. It is located on the boundary between the North Tabor and Rose City Park neighborhoods.

The station is at the intersection of NE 60th Avenue and Interstate 84, located above a Union Pacific line, but below street level. This station is connected to NE 60th Avenue by a series of stairs and elevators.  The single island platform is separated from the westbound lanes of the freeway by only a low wall and the eastbound MAX tracks, causing the platform level of this station to be noisy most hours of the day.

The station was located in TriMet fare zone 2 from its opening in 1986 until September 2012, at which time TriMet discontinued all use of zones in its fare structure.

Bus line connections
This station is served by the following bus line:
71 - 60th Ave

References

External links
Station information (with westbound ID number) from TriMet
Station information (with eastbound ID number) from TriMet
MAX Light Rail Stations – more general TriMet page

1986 establishments in Oregon
MAX Blue Line
MAX Green Line
MAX Red Line
MAX Light Rail stations
North Tabor, Portland, Oregon
Railway stations in the United States opened in 1986
Rose City Park, Portland, Oregon
Railway stations in Portland, Oregon